Rădeni is a commune in Strășeni District, Moldova. It is composed of three villages: Drăgușeni, Rădeni and Zamciogi.

References

Communes of Strășeni District